Sexy Shop is a 2014 Italian comedy film written by Vincenzo Marega and directed by Maria Erica Pacileo and Fernando Maraghini and starring  Andrea Chimenti, Ivan Cattaneo, Elisabetta Viviani and Gazebo.

In the film, several protagonists of the Italian music scene of the 1980s appear as actors and clients. The author of the novel, Vincenzo Marega, in addition to participating as an actor, also produced the film by winning the Enzo Biagi Prize in the beginners category "for the quality of the production of cinematographic fiction" at the Sixteenth Italian Television Festival.

Plot 

Luca, a fifty-year-old salesman in a sex shop, is struggling with his own dissatisfaction as a musician. The film describes his adventures and those of his two former comrades during a single day. The sex shop is the emblem of the many personalities of the protagonists, of their hidden and unspeakable desires, not only necessarily of a sexual nature.

Cast 

 Andrea Chimenti as Luca Gobbi
 Vincenzo Marega as Giorgio
 Uberto Kovacevich as Uberto Stacci
 Giulia Mercati as Betta
 Michele D’Urso: Il carrozziere
 Antonio Barillari as Marshal Antonio Petruzzi
 Alessandro Nicoletti as Brigadier
 Michela Cembran as Pornostar Lilì Roden
 Cindy Cattaruzza as Anna
 Johnson Righeira as Maniacal Customer
 Garbo as Client
 Ivan Cattaneo as Gipsy
 Gazebo as The Doctor
 Maurizio Arcieri as The Mister
 Gian Maria Accusani as The Guy
 Tre Allegri Ragazzi Morti as The Thefter
 Elisabetta Viviani as Onirica's Manager
 Veit Heinichen as Writer
 Luca Riccobon as Trans
 Marisa Fumis as Nurse

See also  

 List of Italian films of 2014

References

External links 

 

2014 comedy films
2014 films
Italian comedy films
2010s Italian films